NGC 261 is a diffuse nebula located in the constellation Tucana. It was discovered on September 5, 1826 by James Dunlop.

References

External links
 

0261
Tucana (constellation)